The Young Party (GP) is a populist political party in Turkey. The GENÇPARTİ does not have a chairperson officially.

History

2002 elections 

Cem Uzan entered politics 90 days before the 2002 elections. Young Party was not eligible to enter the elections and Yeniden Doğuş Partisi (YDP) was a small party which was eligible to enter elections. So, money was poured by Uzan to take over YDP by delegate elections. In the legislative elections on 3 November 2002, the party got 7.5% of the popular vote and no seats. It was considered as success for a political party to get 7.5% of the vote at the first election entered.

2007 elections 
After the 2002 elections TMSF assumed ownership of Uzan's companies and later sold them. Some saw this as an attempt of the current parliament to stop Cem Uzan and his Young Party.  
Young Party only won 3.3% of the vote in 2007 Turkish general election and its candidates were not elected as members of the Grand National Assembly of Turkey. Compared with the 2002 elections, this result means a loss of 4.22% of the public vote.

Media power of the party 
Cem Uzan was the owner of Star TV and Star newspaper and used his newspaper and TV station to the best of his ability to promote his party, which is why he has been labelled a Turkish version of Silvio Berlusconi. When he was under investigation, he used advertising space between the first and second halves of Champions League football games to launch political assaults upon his opponents.
After his tough speech about current Prime Minister (Recep Tayyip Erdogan), TMSF assumed ownership of his companies and later sold them.

Some party members 
Other than Cem Uzan, Turkish arabesque star İbrahim Tatlıses, parliament member Emin Şirin, former parliament member Adil Asirimand and some new politicians like Kaan Aytuğ, Cenk Aktan are some of the recognisable members of the Young Party.

Election results

General elections

See also 
 List of political parties in Turkey

References

External links

 
http://www.cenkuzan.tr.gg
http://www.cenkuzan.piczo.com
http://www.gencturkgucu.org
http://www.gencpartiankara.com

1992 establishments in Turkey
2002 establishments in Turkey
Centrist parties in Turkey
Liberal parties in Turkey
Political parties established in 1992
Political parties established in 2002
Political parties in Turkey
Populist parties
Secularism in Turkey